Asterodermus (from  , 'star' and  , 'skin') is an extinct genus of guitarfish from the Jurassic Period. A single species, A. platypterus, is described. It is known mainly from the early Tithonian of Germany, including the famous Lagerstätte site of Solnhofen. Additionally, Asterodermus scales have been found among articulated skeletons of neoselachians from the Tithonian of southern Germany.

References

Rhinobatidae
Prehistoric cartilaginous fish genera
Taxa named by Louis Agassiz